Suryamal Mishran Shikhar Award is a literary honour granted by the Rajasthani Bhasha Sahitya and Sanskriti Akademi for special contribution to Rajasthani literature. It was established in the memory of the 19th century poet-historian Suryamal Misran.

Recipients
The award consists of 79,000. Following is the list of recipients:

References

External links 
 Rajasthani Bhasha Sahitya and Sanskriti Akademi

Rajasthani arts
Rajasthani literature
Awards established in 1985
Literary awards by language
Rajasthan-related lists
Rajasthani-language writers